Indomelothria is a genus of flowering plants belonging to the family Cucurbitaceae.

Its native range is Indo-China to Western Malesia.

Species:

Indomelothria blumei 
Indomelothria chlorocarpa

References

Cucurbitaceae
Cucurbitaceae genera